The collared crow (Corvus torquatus), also known as the ring-necked crow or white-collared crow, is a member of the family Corvidae native to China and north of Vietnam.

Description
It is about 52–55 cm in length—the same size or slightly larger than the carrion crow (C. corone), with proportionately slightly longer wings, tail and bill. A sleek and handsome bird, it has glossy black plumage except for the back of the neck, upper back (mantle), and a broad band around the lower breast that is white. The bill, legs and feet are black.

It sometimes flies with its feet hanging down below the body in a characteristically "lazy" way.

The voice is a loud "kaaar" repeated several times with other slight variations on it to suit the occasion. It also like many other corvids, utters strange clipping and clicking sounds during its head bowing display to another bird.

Distribution and ecology
The range of this species is essentially China, covering large areas of the country though not further north than Beijing. It occurs in plains and low lying river valleys in fairly open country and cultivated regions and is a common sight in paddy fields. It tends to avoid large towns and cities and is predominantly a rural species.

Food is sought mainly on the ground where a large range of items are taken, such as insects, mollusks and other invertebrates (even from shallow water), grains, especially rice and it also searches among refuse for suitable food items left by humans. It appears to take less carrion than other species but will if the opportunity arises, and will also take eggs and nestlings.

The nest is usually in a tree and is plastered with mud. There are usually 3–4 eggs laid.

It was formerly classified as a Species of Least Concern by the IUCN. But new research has shown it to be rarer than it was believed. It was uplisted to Near Threatened status in 2008 and Vulnerable in 2018.

References

External links 
 

collared crow
collared crow
Birds of China
collared crow
Taxobox binomials not recognized by IUCN